The 2015 FIBA Europe Under-18 Championship Division C was the 11th edition of the Division C of the FIBA U18 European Championship, the third tier of the European men's under-18 basketball championship. It was played in Gibraltar, from 14 to 19 July 2015. Andorra men's national under-18 basketball team won the tournament.

Participating teams

First round

Group A

Group B

Playoffs

Final standings

References

External links
FIBA official website

FIBA U18 European Championship Division C
2015–16 in European basketball
FIBA U18
Sports competitions in Gibraltar
FIBA